The 2022–23 season is the 131st in the history of Club Brugge KV and their 63rd consecutive season in the top flight. In addition to the domestic league, they participated in the Belgian Cup, Belgian Super Cup and UEFA Champions League.

Players

Transfers

In

Out

Pre-season and friendlies

Competitions

Overall record

Pro League

League table

Results summary

Results by round

Matches
The league fixtures were announced on 22 June 2022.

Belgian Cup

Belgian Super Cup

UEFA Champions League

Group stage
The draw for the group stage was held on 25 August 2022.

Knockout stage

Round of 16
The draw for the round of 16 was held on 7 November 2022.

Statistics

Squad appearances and goals
Last updated on 7 March 2023

|-
! colspan=14 style=background:#dcdcdc; text-align:center|Goalkeepers

|-
! colspan=14 style=background:#dcdcdc; text-align:center|Defenders

|-
! colspan=14 style=background:#dcdcdc; text-align:center|Midfielders

|-
! colspan=14 style=background:#dcdcdc; text-align:center|Forwards

|-
! colspan=14 style=background:#dcdcdc; text-align:center|Players who have made an appearance this season but have left the club

|}

References

Club Brugge KV seasons
Brugge
Brugge